Terminalia novocaledonica is a species of plant in the Combretaceae family. It is endemic to New Caledonia.

References

Endemic flora of New Caledonia
novocaledonica
Vulnerable plants
Taxonomy articles created by Polbot